A fractal is a mathematical set that has a fractal dimension that usually exceeds its topological dimension and may fall between the integers. There is also a fractal derivative, defined in fractal spacetime.

Fractal or Fractals may also refer to:
Fractal (EP), 2009 album by Swedish metal band Skyfire
Fractal (video game), 2011 puzzle game by Philadelphia-based studio Cipher Prime
Fractal art, form of algorithmic art
Fractal Design, Swedish hardware company
Fractals (journal), scientific journal published by World Scientific
Fractal (software), an instant messaging client and collaboration software
The Baudelaire Fractal, a 2020 novel by Lisa Robertson